The discography of Nada Surf, a New York-based alternative rock group, consists of nine studio albums, thirteen singles and one extended play (EP). Nada Surf was formed in 1992 and consists of Matthew Caws (guitar, vocals), Daniel Lorca (bass, backup vocals), Ira Elliot (drums, backup vocals), and Doug Gillard (lead guitar).

Albums

Studio albums

Extended plays

Other records

Singles

Other releases
Where Is My Mind? Tribute to the Pixies (Contributing "Where Is My Mind?") - Glue Factory - 1999
This Is Next Year: A Brooklyn-Based Compilation (featuring "Blizzard of '77") - Arena Rock Recording Co. - 2001*
Music from the OC: Mix 2 (featuring "If You Leave" (OMD cover)) - WEA - 2004
Future Soundtrack for America ("Your Legs Grow") - Barsuk - 2004*
For the Kids Too! ("Meow Meow Lullaby" (compilation track)) - Nettwerk America - 2004
Love Rocks ("Inside of Love") - Human Rights Campaign/Centaur Entertainment - 2005
Friends With Benefit, (songs from one One Tree Hill) - contributing "Always Love" - 2006
John Tucker Must Die: Music from the Motion Picture ("I Like What You Say") - Wind-Up - 2006*
Rails & Ties ("In the Mirror" (compilation track)) - Milan Records - 2007*
Heroes: Original Soundtrack ("Weightless") - NBC Universal Television, DVD, Music & Consumer Products Group - 2008
Nano-Mugen Compilation 2009 ("Weightless") - Ki/oon Records - 2009

* All are non-album versions of each song

Films, games, TV programs and adverts soundtracks
Nada Surf have been featured several times in the television series One Tree Hill:
"Inside of Love" was played in season 1 episode 13.
 "Always Love" was played in season 3 episode 3.
 The band make a guest appearance on season 3 episode 11 playing "Concrete Bed" in concert as Peyton (Hilarie Burton) is trying to convince their band manager to agree to be a part of the benefit CD which is later named as "Friends with Benefit".
 "See These Bones", "Here Goes Something", "I LIke What You Say" and "The Film Did Not Go Round" appeared in season 5 episode 10.
 "Are You Lightning?" was used in season 6 episode 17, which had Matthew Caws as a guest composer for the episode score.
 Nada Surf performed the "Kitty Cat Song" used as the theme tune for the Catz 2006 PC game, officially titled "Meow Meow Lullaby Remix". The song was written by Matthew Caws, Ira Elliot and Daniel Lorca, with additional vocals from Lianne Smith.
 Nada Surf covered The Beatles' classic "All You Need is Love" in 2006. The cover was featured in a Chase Bank credit card television commercial in the U.S.
 “Blankest Year” featured in a 2006 TV commercial for the Suzuki Swift in Germany.
 The song "Blonde on Blonde" from Let Go is featured during the opening and end credits to the 2004 coming of age German film Sommersturm (Summer Storm). "Blonde on Blonde" is also featured in the 2004 John Travolta film, A Love Song for Bobby Long, and in the television series Six Feet Under.
"What is Your Secret" from The Weight Is a Gift, was featured in "A New Light", episode 3 of the ABC series Six Degrees.
 Nada Surf recorded a cover of the classic 1980s song "If You Leave" by OMD for the television series The O.C. The song played during a prominent scene in which Seth Cohen (Adam Brody) shares an emotional goodbye with Anna Stern (Samaire Armstrong). This scene was a tribute to the John Hughes film Pretty in Pink, in which the OMD version of the song originally appeared.
 Nada Surf songs have been played three times in the television show How I Met Your Mother; "Inside of Love" was featured in the first season, "Always Love" was featured in the twelfth episode of the second season, and "Beautiful Beat" was featured in the closing moments of the twelfth episode of the third season as Ted (Josh Radnor) revisits the bar.
 "Always Love" is featured on the soundtrack to the 2007 film Disturbia.
 "Zen Brain" is featured in the 2001 German film .
 "Hyperspace" is featured in the 2004 German film The Edukators and the 2009 remake of My Bloody Valentine.
 Nada Surf's song "I Like What You Say" is featured in the 2006 film John Tucker Must Die.
 Nada Surf's song "Weightless", from their album Lucky, premiered in the 30th episode (season 2, episode 7, "Out of Time") of the NBC television series Heroes, on November 6, 2007, and will appear on its original soundtrack.
 "The Fox" from Nada Surf's album Lucky is featured in the closing montage of The Riches episode 204 "Slums of Bayou Hills".
 "Happy Kid" is featured in the opening scenes of an episode of Numb3rs entitled "When Worlds Collide".

Covers
 "If I Had a Hi-Fi" is entirely covers chosen by the band
 Nada Surf play the title track of the Pixies tribute album, Where Is My Mind?.
 Daniel and Matthew went to school at the Lycée Français de New York and also spent time in France and Belgium as children. They have been influenced by French culture, and the band has recorded cover versions of Alain Souchon's song "La p'tite Bill est malade", Indochine's "L'Aventurier", and Françoise Hardy's "Au Fond d'un Rêve Doré"
 Nada Surf covered The Beatles' classic "All You Need is Love" in 2006.
The band has covered the Stooges song "I'm Sick of You" for the Iggy Pop tribute album, We Will Fall.
 The band covered OMD's "If You Leave" for the Music from the OC: Mix 2 soundtrack album.
 They have covered the song "Blue Moon" for the Big Star tribute.
 Nada Surf covered The Smiths' classic "There Is a Light That Never Goes Out" for a BBC Radio 6 Music tribute operation, featuring Ed Harcourt on keyboard. They subsequently included it to their set lists.
 On January 17, 2008, the group covered "Ooh La La" by 1970s rock band Faces during an acoustic show for a local radio station in Hamburg, Germany.
  The band covered the song "Why Are You So Mean To Me?" originally by the band Vitreous Humor.
 They also covered ASIAN KUNG-FU GENERATION's song "Mustang" on the Nano-Mugen Compilation 2011.

Notes

References

Rock music group discographies
Discographies of American artists